The Yugoslav volunteers in the Spanish Civil War, known as Spanish fighters and Yugoslav brigadistas, was a contingent of volunteers from the Kingdom of Yugoslavia that fought for the Republicans (in support of the Second Spanish Republic) during the Spanish Civil War (1936–1939). An estimated 1,664 "Yugoslav brigadistas" fought in the war, out of whom c. 800 were killed in action. According to Spanish statistics, 148 Yugoslav volunteers received the officer rank during the conflict.
 
Most of them fought in the battalions Dimitrov and Đuro Đaković of the International Brigades, and many of them participated and perished during the Battle of Ebro in 1938. They were recruited by the outlawed Communist Party of Yugoslavia in their home regions or through the recruitment centre of the Comintern that Josip Broz Tito managed in Paris. There were four airmen among the volunteers the most notable one being the fighter pilot Božidar "Boško" Petrović, who attained the status flying ace.

After the war, those who managed to flee across the Pyrenees, fell captive in internment camps in France, where the Yugoslav communist organisation illegally repatriated many of them. Some of whom became leaders of the resistance against the Nazi occupation. Three members of the International brigades that fought on the Republican side ended up commanding the four armies of the Partisan Liberation Army, which fought the Nazis in World War II: Peko Dapčević, Kosta Nađ and Petar Drapšin. Koča Popović was the partisan commander who was fighting for the Spanish Republican Armed Forces.

Composition 
According to Spanish statistics, 1052 Yugoslavs were recorded as volunteers of which 48% were Croats, 23% Slovenes, 18% Serbs, 2.3% Montenegrins and 1.5% Macedonians.

Legacy 
A street in New Belgrade, a municipality of Belgrade, the capital of Serbia, bears the name Španskih boraca (Spanish fighters).
The People's Library in Podgorica, Montenegro is named after Radosav Ljumović, a Montenegrin volunteer in the Spanish Civil War.
The "Španski Borci" cultural centre in Ljubljana, Slovenia, is named after the Yugoslav volunteers in the Spanish Civil War.

Notable people

 Đorđe Andrejević-Kun (1904–1964)
  (1912–1999)
  (1914–2001)
  (1904–1942)
  (1914–1941)
 Aleš Bebler (1907–1981)
  (1905–1942)
  (1905–1989)
  (1913–1942)
  (1913–1937)
 Milan Blagojević Španac (1905–1941)
  (1912–1986)
  (1897–1941)
  (1905–1995)
  (1910–1942)
 August Cesarec (1893–1941)
  (1911–1944)
  (1914–2010)
 Rodoljub Čolaković (1900–1983)
 Milan Ćopić (1897–1941)
 Vladimir Ćopić (1891–1939)
 Matija Šiprak (1913–1937)
  (1912–1941)
  (1917–1941)
  (1905–1938)
  (1914–1943)
  (1905–1974)
  (1912–1942)
  (1909–1941)
 Peko Dapčević (1913–1999)
  (1907–1941)
 Robert Domany (1918–1942)
 Žikica Jovanović Španac (1914–1942)
 Petar Drapšin (1914–1945)
  (1912–1942)
 Ivan Gošnjak (1909–1980)
  (1914–1944)
  (1895–1941)
  (1884–1959)
  (1903–1942)
  (1900–1936)
  (1903–1989)
  (1905–1994)
  (1906–1974)
  (1910–1942)
  (1914–1976)
  (1901–1939)
 Žikica Jovanović Španac (1914–1942)
  (1908–1942)
  (1911–1943)
  (1914–2004)
  (1911–1944)
  (1884–1946)
 Josip Kopinič (1911–1997)
  (1912–1938)
 Veljko Kovačević (1912–1994)
  (1906–1986)
  (1913–1992)
 Josip Križaj (1911–1948)
 Dušan Kveder (1915–1966)
  (1916–1941)
  (1905–1942)
 Branko Krsmanović (1915–1941)
  (1906–1945)
  (1915–2006)
  (1913–1986)
 Vladimir Majder (1911–1943)
  (1902–1939)
  (1914–1979)
  (1910–1937)
  (1895–1963)
  (1902–1987)
  (1919–1942)
 Kosta Nađ (1911–1986)
 Guido Nonveiller (1913–2002)
 Gojko Nikoliš (1911–1995)
  (1904–1942)
 Marko Orešković (1896–1941)
 Blagoje Parović (1903–1937)
  (1913–1943)
 Boško Petrović (1911–1937)
  (1913–1942)
 Koča Popović (1908–1992)
 Vlado Popović (1914–1972)
  (1901–1944)
  (1911–1941)
  (1915–1963)
  (1908–1937)
 Franc Rozman (1911–1944)
 Ivan Rukavina (1912–1992)
  (1915–1941)
  (1914–1941)
  (1913–1943)
 Drago Štajnberger (1916–1942)
  (1911–1984)
  (1915–1985)
  (1913–1937)
  (1914–1990)
  (1900–1978)
  (1912–1993)
  (1915–1997)
  (1896–1937)
  (1911–1991)
  (1907–1941)
 Veljko Vlahović (1914–1975)
  (1901–1943)
 Ratko Vujović (1916–1977)
  (1905–1941)
  (1903–1977)
  (1913–1944)
  (1918–1942)

References

Sources

External links 

Живојин Павловић, Биланс совјетског термидора: Приказ и открића о делатности и организацији Стаљинског терора
Свједочанства о Далматинцима у Шпањолском грађанском рату
др Август Лешник - „Крв и живот за слободу“ – Југословени интербригадисти у Шпанији (1936—1939)
MDC "Mihovil Vojnović" Retrieved 2012-02-29
Beogradski Short Film Festival "In Memoriam" Retrieved 2012-02-29
 Website of the Association of Yugoslav Volunteers, «YuInterBrigade» 
 YouTube «Naši Španci - Jugoslaveni u Španjolskom građanskom ratu» (Gallery)

Foreign volunteers in the Spanish Civil War
Military units and formations established in 1936
Military units and formations disestablished in 1938
International Brigades
Yugoslav soldiers
Yugoslav expatriates in Spain
Communism in Yugoslavia
Yugoslav communists